Teresa Martinez is an American politician and Republican Majority Whip for the Arizona House of Representatives, serving the 16th legislative district. She was initially appointed to the seat in 2021 after incumbent Representative Bret Roberts resigned from office. In 2022, she was elected for a full term.

Martinez was born and raised in Casa Grande, the heart of Pinal County. She is the oldest of 5 children and her dad was a miner at the San Manuel Mine.

She has a long history working in politics, holding staff positions for two Members of Congress, Congressman Rick Renzi and Congressman Paul Gosar, and with the Arizona Secretary of State's office under Republican Michelle Reagan. She also previously worked as political director for the Arizona Republican Party.

Before getting into politics, Teresa worked as long-term substitute teacher at her alma mater Casa Grande Union High School for several years and at the Frito Lay factory in Casa Grande.

References

External links
 Official page at the Arizona State Legislature
 Biography at Ballotpedia

21st-century American politicians
Hispanic and Latino American state legislators in Arizona
Hispanic and Latino American women in politics
Living people
Republican Party members of the Arizona House of Representatives
Year of birth missing (living people)